Picchetti Ranch can refer to:

Picchetti Brothers Winery
Picchetti Ranch Open Space Preserve